Carter House may refer to:
 Carter–Jones House, Yellville, Arkansas, listed on the National Register of Historic Places (NRHP) in Marion County
 Carter House Inn, Eureka, California, a 1982 remake of San Francisco home lost in 1906
 Walde–Carter House, Washington, D.C., in Northwest Quadrant
 Leonard Carter House, Jesup, Georgia, NRHP-listed in Wayne County
 Ritch–Carter–Martin House, Odum, Georgia, NRHP-listed in Wayne County
 Jimmy Carter National Historic Site, Plains, Georgia, NRHP-listed in Sumter County
 Bond–Baker–Carter House, Royston, Georgia, NRHP-listed in Franklin County
 Frederick B. Carter Jr. House, Evanston, Illinois, NRHP-listed in Cook County
 Carter House (Elkader, Iowa), NRHP-listed in Clayton County
 Nicholas Carter House, Hodgenville, Kentucky, NRHP-listed in LaRue County
 Atkins–Carter House, Louisa, Kentucky, NRHP-listed in Lawrence County
 Elmore–Carter House, Summersville, Kentucky, NRHP-listed in Green County
 Carter House (Versailles, Kentucky), NRHP-listed in Woodford County
 Carter House (Hammond, Louisiana), NRHP-listed in Tangipahoa Parish
 Carter Plantation, Springfield, Louisiana, NRHP-listed in Livingston Parish
 Carter Mansion, Reading, Massachusetts, NRHP-listed
 Carter–Callaway House, Ocean Springs, Mississippi, NRHP-listed in Jackson County
 Benjamin H. Carter House, Quitman, Mississippi, NRHP-listed in Clarke County
 Carter–Swain House, Democrat, North Carolina, NRHP-listed in Buncombe County
 Roberts–Carter House, Gatesville, North Carolina, NRHP-listed in Gates County
 W. F. Carter House, Mount Airy, North Carolina, NRHP-listed in Surry County
 William Carter House, Mount Airy, North Carolina, NRHP-listed in Surry County
 John Carter Farmstead, Youngstown, New York, NRHP-listed in Niagara County
 H. B. Carter House, Ashland, Oregon, NRHP-listed in Jackson County
 E. V. Carter House, Ashland, Oregon, NRHP-listed in Jackson County
 Carter–Fortmiller House, Ashland, Oregon, NRHP-listed in Jackson County
 Carter–Goodrich House, Dayton, Oregon, NRHP-listed in Yamhill County
 Carter–Worth House and Farm, Marshallton, Pennsylvania, NRHP-listed in Chester County
 John and Landon Carter House, Elizabethton, Tennessee, NRHP-listed in Carter County, Tennessee
 Carter House (Franklin, Tennessee), a Tennessee state-owned historic site
 W. T. Carter Jr. House, Houston, Texas, NRHP-listed in Harris County
 Maverick–Carter House, San Antonio, Texas, NRHP-listed in Bexar County
 Carter–Terry–Call House, Orem, Utah, NRHP-listed in Utah County
 Carter–Gilmer House, Charlottesville, Virginia, NRHP-listed
 A. P. and Sara Carter House, Maces Spring, Virginia, NRHP-listed in Scott County
 A. P. Carter Homeplace, Maces Spring, Virginia, NRHP-listed in Scott County
 Maybelle and Ezra Carter House, Maces Spring, Virginia, NRHP-listed in Scott County
 John Waddey Carter House, Martinsville, Virginia, NRHP-listed in Henry County
 Carter Farm, Wheeling, West Virginia, NRHP-listed in Ohio County

See also
Carter Block, St. Cloud, Minnesota, NRHP-listed